Heraclius (Greek: Ήράκλειος) was born between 667 and 685, and was the son, and second of two children, of Byzantine Emperor Constantine IV and his wife, Empress Anastasia.

Unlike his older brother Justinian II, he was never made co-emperor under his father, and was never emperor.  In contrast, the brothers of his father, Heraclius and Tiberius, had been crowned Augusti with Constantine IV during the reign of their father Constans II, but in 681 Constantine IV had them mutilated so they would be ineligible to rule.

Heraclius is noted in the Liber Pontificalis under Pope Benedict II who received locks of hair from Justinian and Heraclius ("domni Iustiniani et Heraclii filiorum…principis"), sent by their father, Constantine IV in 684/685.  Such a gesture was understood as being a sign of adoption by the Pope of the two children. Heraclius survived his father, but there is no record of him after the death of Constantine IV from dysentery in 685; in contrast, his brother Justinian II's death is known as 711, while his mother Anastasia outlived all her family and died sometime after 711.

Notes

References

Bibliography

 

Heraclian dynasty
Sons of Byzantine emperors
7th-century births
Year of birth uncertain
Year of death unknown
7th-century Byzantine people